Fos-related antigen 2 (FRA2) is a protein that in humans is encoded by the FOSL2 gene.

Function 
The Fos gene family consists of 4 members: c-Fos, FOSB, FOSL1, and FOSL2. These genes encode leucine zipper proteins that can dimerize with proteins of the JUN family, thereby forming the transcription factor complex AP-1. As such, the FOS proteins have been implicated as regulators of cell proliferation, differentiation, and transformation.

See also 
 AP-1 (transcription factor)

References

Further reading

External links 
 
 

Transcription factors